Ushakovo (or ;) is a village in the Russian exclave Kaliningrad Oblast. It is situated at the mouth of the Prokhladnaya River at the Vistula Lagoon.

History
The Battle of Pokarwis between pagan Prussians and the Teutonic Knights took place nearby in 1261. The Teutonic Knights founded the village as Brandenburg to honor Otto III, Margrave of Brandenburg who supported the order in the Prussian Crusade, and erected a castle in 1266. It became known as "Brandenburg (Frisches Haff)" and "Brandenburg in Ostpreußen" to differentiate it from Brandenburg an der Havel. In 1454, the region was incorporated by King Casimir IV Jagiellon to the Kingdom of Poland upon the request of the anti-Teutonic Prussian Confederation. After the subsequent Thirteen Years' War, the longest of all Polish–Teutonic wars, since 1466 it formed part of Poland as a fief held by the Teutonic Order, and after 1525 held by secular Ducal Prussia. From the 18th century it formed part of the Kingdom of Prussia, from 1871 it was also part of Germany. After Germany's defeat in World War II, it passed to Soviet Russia.

See also 
 Brandenburg Gate (Kaliningrad)

References

Rural localities in Kaliningrad Oblast
Populated places in Guryevsky District, Kaliningrad Oblast
Castles of the Teutonic Knights